The All-New Super Friends Hour is an American animated television series about a team of superheroes which ran from September 10, 1977, to September 2, 1978, on ABC. It was produced by Hanna-Barbera Productions and is based on the Justice League and associated comic book characters published by DC Comics.

Summary
The popularity of TV's Wonder Woman and The Six Million Dollar Man spurred network interest in reviving the Super Friends program, which had run in the 1973/1974 season. When it was again unveiled in 1977, more young children and teenagers than before tuned in, making The All-New Super Friends Hour a huge ratings success. The success prompted the ABC television network to plan a new and even more innovative series for the fall of 1978.

Characters
In this particular incarnation of the Super Friends, the DC Comic book legends Superman, Batman, Robin, Wonder Woman and Aquaman return to fight for justice. However, this time, they get help from the shape-shifting super-teens The Wonder Twins, along with their space-monkey Gleek.

Format
The All-New Super Friends Hour featured 60 animated shorts and 15 regular episodes per program which followed a basic format each week.
The first segment of every show featured two of the heroes (for the purposes of the team-ups in the first and fourth segments, Batman and Robin were considered one hero) teaming up in a separate mini story. The second segment featured a story with the Wonder Twins.  The typical plot is that teenagers engage in a specific discouraged activity like vandalism or hitchhiking, and the Twins are summoned to deal with it.  Inevitably, the misbehaving teenagers find themselves in danger as a consequence of their misbehavior and the Twins rescue them.

The third segment was considered the "primary" adventure of the week which featured the entire Super Friends roster (including the Wonder Twins) in a longer adventure. The fourth and final segment featured a story with one of the primary lineup along with a special guest star.  The fourth segment typically featured a problem which was solved using the guest star's unique abilities. In addition, there were additional short spots between segments with members of the Super Friends giving basic safety lessons, basic health and first aid advice, magic tricks, craft projects, and a two-part riddle featuring the week's primary plot line.

Syndication/cable
The 15 hour-long shows were later cut into half-hour installments for local syndication in the early 1980s. Episodes from the 1977 series were included in The Superman/Batman Adventures, which aired on the USA Network in 1996 and later on the Cartoon Network and Boomerang, which would air the original hour-long shows from 1977 in their entirety (save for the next week's previews) in July 2004 and again in June 2008.

Character lineup
 Superman
 Batman
 Robin
 Wonder Woman
 Aquaman
 The Wonder Twins
 Zan
 Jayna
 Gleek

Guests
 Black Vulcan
 Apache Chief
 Hawkman
 Hawkgirl
 Rima the Jungle Girl
 Zatanna 
 The Atom (Ray Palmer)
 Green Lantern (Hal Jordan)
 Samurai
 The Flash (Barry Allen)

Black Manta appeared on the episodes "The Whirlpool" and "The Water Beast", where he was referred to simply as "Manta" and his suit color was now olive brown.

Gentleman Ghost appears in the episode titled "Ghost." In this show, he is referred to only as "Gentleman Jim Craddock" instead of "Gentleman Ghost." A man casts a spell to bring Gentleman Ghost to the living so that he can take revenge on Superman and Wonder Woman for imprisoning his spirit. He uses his powers to turn U.N. representatives into ghosts and later turns Superman and Wonder Woman into ghosts. The curse is eventually broken, after which the Super Friends used the mystical Rods of Merlin to send Gentleman Ghost back to his grave, never to return.

List of episodes

Voice Cast
 Norman Alden - Aquaman, Caller, Professor Rogers (in "Will the World Collide?"), Gruth (in "The Ghost")
 Jack Angel - Hawkman, Samurai, Dr. Lau (in "Time Rescue"), Professor Price (in "Forbidden Power")
 Michael Bell - Zan, Gleek, Mechanic (in "The Brain Machine"), Jeff (in "Joy Ride"), Kalmo (in "The Mysterious Time Creatures"), Sully (in "Runaways"), Gary
 Wally Burr - Atom, The Enforcer (in "The Enforcer"), Peterson (in "The Invisible Menace"), Dr. Pisces (in "Attack of the Giant Squid"), Newton's son (in "The Collector"), Zeno Leader (in "Exploration Earth"), Lionex (in "The Lion Men"), Bus Depot Master (in "Runaways")
 Ted Cassidy - Crag the Earthor (in "Invasion of the Earthors")
 Regis Cordic - Manta, Apache Chief (first appearance), Nemus (in "The Invisible Menace"), Professor Martinez (in "The Water Beast"), Jules (in "The Marsh Monster")
 Henry Corden - Vika (in "Tibetan Raiders"), Rudolph Korloff (in "The Mummy of Nazca")
 Danny Dark - Superman
 Shannon Farnon - Wonder Woman, Rima, Hawkgirl, Drowning Boy, Susan (in "Tiger on the Loose"), Newton's daughter (in "The Collector"), Medula (in "The Mind Maidens"), Dr. Taylor (in "The Fifty Foot Woman")
 Wendie Malick - Zatanna
 Pat Fraley - Ron (in "Handicap"), Jack (in "Cheating")
 Bob Hastings - Corky (in "Joy Ride"), Scott (in "Handicap")
 Buster Jones - Black Vulcan
  Jane Jones - Jody (in "Hitchhike")
 Casey Kasem - Robin, Police Officer (in "The Brain Machine"), Tour Guide (in "Invasion of the Earthors"), Mr. Brown, Guest, Justice League Computer, Secret Four Member #3 (in "The Secret Four"), Dictor (in "The Mysterious Time Creatures"), Insecta (in "Coming of the Antropods"), Brunette Scientist (in "The Marsh Monster"), Mr. Thompson (in "Doctor Fright"), Professor Larvey (in "Will the World Collide?)
  Joyce Mancini - Mary Nelson (in "Tiny World of Terror")
 Ross Martin - Secret Four Member #1 (in "The Secret Four"), Professor Strickland (in "Tiny World of Terror")
  Chuck McClennan - Earthor #1 (in "Invasion of the Earthors")
 Alan Oppenheimer - Dr. Cranum (in "The Brain Machine"), (in "The Secret Four"), Hydronoid #2 (in "Invasion of the Hydronoids"), Doctor Fright (in "Doctor Fright"), Wolfman (in "The Man Beasts of Xra"), The Marsh Monster (in "The Marsh Monster"), Captain Shark (in "The Protector"), Gentleman Ghost (in "The Ghost"), Scientist (in "The Ghost")
 Richard Paul - First Mate (in "The Whirlpool")
 Barney Phillips - Flash (Barry Allen)
 Mike Road - Varko (in "Planet of the Neanderthals")
 Michael Rye - Apache Chief, Green Lantern, Abominable Snowman (in "Alaska Peril")
 Olan Soule - Batman, Police Officer (in "The Brain Machine"), Secret Four Member #4 (in “The Secret Four”) Professor Wong (in "Tiny World of Terror"), Professor Fearo (in "Will the World Collide?")
 John Stephenson - Hydronoid Captain (in "Invasion of the Hydronoids"), Police Officer (in "Doctor Fright"), Dr. Droid (in "The Monster of Dr. Droid"), Pantherman (in "The Man Beasts of Xra"), Sculpin (in "Frozen Peril"), Freighter Captain (in "Frozen Peril")
 Richard Steven Horvitz - Klarion the Witch Boy
 Jean Vander Pyl - Dr. Xra (in "The Man Beasts of Xra"), Magda Duval (in "The Marsh Monster")
 Liberty Williams - Jayna, Little Sister
 Bill Woodson - Narrator, Captain Croner (in "The Whirlpool"), Dr. Scat (in "The Brain Machine"), Police Chief (in "The Brain Machine"), Earthor #2 (in "Invasion of the Earthors"), Secret Four Member #2 (in "The Secret Four"), Professor (in "Doctor Fright"), Boris (in "The Monster of Dr. Droid"), Professor Fairweather (in "The Invisible Menace"), Newton Domehead (in "The Collector"), Professor Dalton (in "Alaska Peril"), Professor Zarkoff (in "Forbidden Power"), Mutant (in "Forbidden Power"), Dr. Markham (in "The Man Beasts of Xra"), Jay's Pop (in "Runaways"), Cleazor (in "Will the World Collide?"), Professor Comstock (in "Time Rescue")

Home media
Warner Home Video (via DC Comics Entertainment, Hanna-Barbera Cartoons and Warner Bros. Family Entertainment) released The All-New Super Friends Hour – Season 1, Volume 1 on DVD on January 8, 2008, containing 7 uncut, original episodes (28 cartoon segments), restored and remastered, and presented in its original, unedited hour-long version and original broadcast presentation. However, the episodes are not in their original airdate order just as they originally aired on ABC. On January 27, 2009, Warner released The All-New Super Friends Hour – Season 1, Volume 2 featuring the remaining eight episodes.

DC Super Friends
Despite using the main theme from The World's Greatest Super Friends, the 2010 DC Super Friends "The Joker's Playhouse" shares several elements of its opening sequence with The All-New Super Friends Hour including introducing several of the Super Friends by name.

References

External links
 Superman Homepage: Hanna Barbera's Super Friends – The All-New Super Friends Hour
 The All-New Super Friends Hour at Big Cartoon DataBase
 
 The All-New Super Friends Hour @ Legions of Gotham

1977 American television series debuts
1978 American television series endings
1970s American animated television series
1970s American science fiction television series
American animated television spin-offs
American children's animated action television series
American children's animated adventure television series
American children's animated science fantasy television series
American children's animated superhero television series
Animated television shows based on DC Comics
English-language television shows
Television series by Hanna-Barbera
Television series set in 1977
Television series set in the 4th millennium
American Broadcasting Company original programming
Animated Batman television series
Animated Justice League television series
Animated Superman television series
Wonder Woman in other media
Super Friends
Twins in fiction
Television series about shapeshifting